The Power of One or Power of One may refer to:

Music
 "Power of One" (song), a 1995 single by Merril Bainbridge
 The Power of One (album), a 2009 album by Israel Houghton
 "The Power of One" (song), a 2000 single by Donna Summer from Pokemon: The Movie 2000 soundtrack
 The Power of One (soundtrack), soundtrack to the 1992 film
 The Power of One, a song by Sonata Arctica on the album Silence
 Power of One, an album by Lizard. Also a song on the album of the same name.

Film and television
 The Power of One (film), a 1992 film based on the novel of the same name
 The Power of One (TV series), an Australian television series
 The Power of One, a segment of Pokémon: The Movie 2000
 "The Power of One", a children's program on the Christian-based Smile television network

Books
 The Power of One (novel), a 1989 novel by Bryce Courtenay
 Power of One, a book by Ron Luce

Other
 The Power of One, a Canadian solar car team